Galina Savinkova (born 15 July 1953) is a retired female track and field athlete from the Soviet Union, who set the world record in the women's discus throw on 23 May 1983 with a distance of 73.26 metres. A year later, on 8 September 1984 in Donetsk, she reached 73.28 metres. That mark still is the Russian national record.

Achievements

External links 
All-Time Lists

Soviet female discus throwers
1953 births
Living people
World record setters in athletics (track and field)
Place of birth missing (living people)
European Athletics Championships medalists